Joseph Gabriel Gambardella (born December 1, 1993) is an American professional ice hockey player for the Utica Comets of the American Hockey League (AHL) while under contract to the New Jersey Devils of the National Hockey League (NHL). He attended the University of Massachusetts–Lowell where he played college hockey and was a business major. Undrafted into the NHL,  Gambardella signed an entry-level contract with the Edmonton Oilers in 2017.

Playing career
While playing at Monsignor Farrell High School during the 2009–10 season, Gambardella was selected as an Advance All Star. He chose to forgo his senior year at Farrell and try out for a junior team. He joined the New Jersey Rockets in the Atlantic Junior Hockey League under coach Bob Thornton who also worked for the United States Hockey League. On Thornton's request, Gambardella tried out for the Des Moines Buccaneers midway through the 2011–12 season and made the team.

In his second season with the Buccaneers, and his first full season with the team, Gambardella was named an alternate captain and announced his commitment to the University of Massachusetts Lowell in December 2012.  During this season, Gambardella was hit in the face with a puck causing a broken left cheek, sinus and orbital bones and a cut that required stitches. He finished the game but was forced to miss 5 weeks to recover from required surgery. He ended the season with 36 points in 48 games.

Collegiate
Enrolled as a business major at the University of Massachusetts–Lowell, Gambardella played in 41 games his freshman season. He competed in the 2014 NCAA Division I Men's Ice Hockey Tournament but Massachusetts–Lowell lost to Boston College in the Northeast Region.

In his sophomore year, Gambardella set a new career high 30 points in 38 games. As the River Hawks competed in the 2015 Hockey East playoffs, Gambardella had a five-game point run. He ended the season tied for first nationally with three shorthanded goals.

On September 30, 2016, Gambardella was named an alternate captain for the River Hawks prior to his Junior year. In his junior year, Gambardella competed in all 40 games of the season as the River Hawks made another playoff push. He ended the season with 27 assists which ranked fourth in the conference and second on the roster with a career high 37 points. He was awarded the Len Ceglarski Sportsmanship Award and the Gus Coutu Award as the player who best exemplifies the spirit of the UMass Lowell Hockey program.

Gambardella concluded his senior season by becoming the first University of Massachusetts–Lowell player to be awarded the Walter Brown Award as the top American born college player in New England. He was also awarded the Len Ceglarski Sportsmanship Award for the second time and was named to the Hockey East Second Team All-Star and Hockey East All-Tournament Team. On March 28, 2017, Gambardella concluded his collegiate career by signing a two-year entry level contract with the Edmonton Oilers for the 2017–18 season. On April 3, 2017, the Edmonton Oilers American Hockey League affiliate, the Bakersfield Condors, signed Gambardella to an amateur try-out agreement to conclude the 2016–17 season with them.

Professional
Gambardella made his professional debut with the Condors on April 5, 2017, against the Texas Stars. He scored a goal and an assist in his debut however the Condors lost 4–3. He ended his season with the Condors playing in six games and scoring three points.

On September 21, 2017, Gambardella was cut from the Oilers 2017 training camp and reassigned to the Condors to begin the 2017–18 season. He played the entire season with the Condors, scoring 19 points in 50 games.

After being cut from the Oiler training camp, Gambardella began the 2018–19 season in the AHL with the Condors. On December 30, 2018, Gambardella earned his first NHL recall after playing in 28 games and collecting 21 points. He made his NHL debut on December 31, 2018, in a 4–3 loss to the Winnipeg Jets.

On May 29, 2019, the Oilers re-signed Gambardella to a two-year contract extension.

Following his fifth season within the Oilers organization, Gambardella signed as a free agent closer to home in agreeing to a two-year, two-way contract with the New Jersey Devils on July 29, 2021.

Personal life
While playing hockey in college, Gambardella started a youth training organization called Stride to Greatness. As a result of its success, the local arena was renamed the Joe Gambardella Training Centre.

Gambardella's younger brother Christopher also played hockey.

Career statistics

Awards and honors

References

External links

1993 births
Living people
American expatriate ice hockey players in Canada
American men's ice hockey centers
Bakersfield Condors players
Des Moines Buccaneers players
Edmonton Oilers players
Ice hockey players from New York (state)
Monsignor Farrell High School alumni
UMass Lowell River Hawks men's ice hockey players
University of Massachusetts Lowell alumni
Undrafted National Hockey League players
Utica Comets players